Kumashiro (written: 熊代 or 神代) is a Japanese surname. Notable people with the surname include:

, Japanese politician
, Japanese baseball player
, Japanese film director
, Japanese painter of the Edo period

Japanese-language surnames